Michel Vallière (born 20 March 1962) is a Canadian-born French former ice hockey goaltender.

Early life 
Vallière was born in Montreal, Quebec, Canada.

Career 
Vallière played in the International Hockey League for the Flint Spirits and the Salt Lake Golden Eagles and the American Hockey League for the Baltimore Skipjacks before moving to Europe. He went on to play in France for Ducs d'Angers and Brest Albatros Hockey as well in Germany for the Nürnberg Ice Tigers.

Vallière also competed in the men's tournament at the 1994 Winter Olympics.

References

External links

1962 births
Living people
Baltimore Skipjacks players
Brest Albatros Hockey players
Canadian ice hockey goaltenders
Chamonix HC players
Ducs d'Angers players
Flint Spirits players
French ice hockey goaltenders
Ice hockey players at the 1994 Winter Olympics
Nürnberg Ice Tigers players
Olympic ice hockey players of France
RPI Engineers men's ice hockey players
Salt Lake Golden Eagles (IHL) players
Ice hockey people from Montreal